Luis David Bardalez Tuisima (born 3 October 1995) is a Peruvian weightlifter. He won the bronze medal in the men's 67kg event at the 2019 Pan American Games held in Lima, Peru. He also won the bronze medal in his event at the 2022 Pan American Weightlifting Championships held in Bogotá, Colombia.

Career 

He competed in the men's 67kg event at the 2018 World Weightlifting Championships held in Ashgabat, Turkmenistan. In 2019, he won the bronze medal in the men's 67kg Clean & Jerk event at the Pan American Weightlifting Championships held in Guatemala City, Guatemala. In that same year, he competed in the men's 67kg at the World Weightlifting Championships held in Pattaya, Thailand.

He won the bronze medal in the men's 67kg Clean & Jerk event at the 2021 Pan American Weightlifting Championships held in Guayaquil, Ecuador. He also won the bronze medal in the men's 67kg Clean & Jerk event at the 2022 Bolivarian Games held in Valledupar, Colombia.

He competed in the men's 67kg event at the 2022 South American Games held in Asunción, Paraguay. He competed in the men's 61kg event at the 2022 World Weightlifting Championships held in Bogotá, Colombia.

Achievements

References

External links 
 

Living people
1995 births
Peruvian male weightlifters
Weightlifters at the 2019 Pan American Games
Medalists at the 2019 Pan American Games
Pan American Games bronze medalists for Peru
Pan American Games medalists in weightlifting
Pan American Weightlifting Championships medalists
South American Games bronze medalists for Peru
South American Games medalists in weightlifting
Competitors at the 2018 South American Games
Competitors at the 2022 South American Games
21st-century Peruvian people